The 1999–00 National League 2 South (sponsored by Jewson) was the thirteenth full season of rugby union within the fourth tier (south) of the English league system, and the last until 2009–10 to use the name National League 2 South.  It is counterpart to National League 2 North, which covers the northern half of the country.    

At the end of the season, Esher were crowned as champions gaining promotion to the 2000–01 National Division 2 (former National League 1), 5 points clear of second place Penzance & Newlyn.  At the other end of the table, the first side to go down were Metropolitan Police who had a truly awful campaign with 26 losses from 26 games despite having finished 5th the previous season.  They were followed by Norwich and Bridgwater & Albion who were much more competitive but still somewhat short of 12th placed Weston-super-Mare, who finished four points clear.  Metropolitan Police and Norwich would drop to London 1 while Bridgwater Albion would fall to South West 1.  

The reason National League 2 South had three relegation places compared to National League 2 North (who had one) was that both of the two teams relegated from the division above were based in the south of the country, requiring more places to accommodate for their arrival the following season.

Structure

Each team played home and away matches against each of the other teams, playing a total of twenty-six matches each. The league champions were promoted to National Division 2 while the bottom three sides dropped to either London 1 or South West 1 depending on locality.

Participating teams and locations

League table

Sponsorship
National League 2 South is part of the Jewson National Leagues is sponsored by Jewson.

References

N4
National League 2 South